The 1930 Kilkenny Senior Hurling Championship was the 36th staging of the Kilkenny Senior Hurling Championship since its establishment by the Kilkenny County Board.

On 12 October 1930, Tullaroan won the championship after a 4–04 to 0–03 defeat of first-time finalists Urlingford in the final. It was their 15th championship title overall and their first title in five championship seasons.

Results

Semi-finals

Final

References

Kilkenny Senior Hurling Championship
Kilkenny Senior Hurling Championship